The Bull River Guard Station, also known as Bull River Ranger Station, on the banks of the Bull River near its confluence with the E. Fork Bull River in the Kootenai National Forest, in Sanders County, Montana, was established in 1907.  The property was listed on the National Register of Historic Places in 1990.

The office/residence at the site was built in 1908.  It is a one-and-a-half-story log building on a concrete wall foundation.  It was built by Granville "Granny" Gordon, said to be "a Wyoming cowboy and 'one of Teddy Roosevelt's "instant rangers"'".

References

National Register of Historic Places in Sanders County, Montana
Buildings and structures completed in 1908
1908 establishments in Montana
Log buildings and structures on the National Register of Historic Places in Montana
Kootenai National Forest
Rustic architecture in Montana
United States Forest Service ranger stations